is a Japanese freestyle skier. He competed in the men's aerials event at the 1994 Winter Olympics.

References

1966 births
Living people
Japanese male freestyle skiers
Olympic freestyle skiers of Japan
Freestyle skiers at the 1994 Winter Olympics
People from Nagano (city)
20th-century Japanese people